Duncansby Head  ( or  Dùn Gasbaith) is the most northeasterly part of both the Scottish and British mainlands, slightly northeast of John o' Groats. It lies approximately 20 km (12 mi) east-southeast of Dunnet Head, the northernmost point of both the Scottish and British mainlands. Duncansby Head is located in Caithness, Highland, in north-eastern Scotland. The headland juts into the North Sea, with the Pentland Firth to its north and west and the Moray Firth to its south.

Lighthouse
The point is marked by Duncansby Head Lighthouse, built by David Alan Stevenson in 1924.

A minor public road leads from John o' Groats to Duncansby Head, which makes Duncansby Head the farthest point by road from Land's End.

The Duncansby Head Site of Special Scientific Interest includes the  stretch of coast south to Skirza Head.  It includes the Duncansby Stacks, prominent sea stacks just off the coast.

Atomic Weapon Test 
In 2016, it was reported in The Sunday Post newspaper that scientists from the Atomic Weapons Establishment in Aldemarston had proposed a nuclear weapon test on the Stacks of Duncansby in 1953, but that the prevailing wet weather was too much for contemporary electronics and the idea was shelved.

See also

 List of lighthouses in Scotland
 List of Northern Lighthouse Board lighthouses

References

External links
 Northern Lighthouse Board 

Headlands of Scotland
Caithness
Sites of Special Scientific Interest in Caithness
Landforms of Highland (council area)